Bleu du Vercors-Sassenage is a mild pasteurized natural rind cow's milk blue cheese originally produced by monks in the Rhône-Alpes region of France in the 14th century. Now made in the Dauphiné area, the cheese has been a protected Appellation d'Origine Contrôlée since 1998. As a requirement, the cheese has to be composed of milk from Montbéliard, Abondance or Villard cows. The cheese is unpressed and uncooked and contains the mold Penicillium roqueforti. In Larousse's Grand Dictionnaire Universel of the 19th century, King Francis I is described as being quite fond of the cheese.

See also
 List of cheeses

References

Cow's-milk cheeses
Blue cheeses
French cheeses
Cheeses with designation of origin protected in the European Union